Lan–Yin Mandarin (Lanyin) is a branch of Mandarin Chinese traditionally spoken throughout Gansu province and in the northern part of Ningxia. In recent decades it has expanded into northern Xinjiang. It forms part of Northwestern Mandarin.  It has also been grouped together with Central Plains Mandarin. The name is a compound of the capitals of the two former provinces where it dominates, Lanzhou and Yinchuan, which are also two of its principal subdialects.

Among Chinese Muslims, it was sometimes written in the Arabic alphabet instead of Chinese characters.

The 14th Dalai Lama, Tenzin Gyatso, spoke the Xining dialect as his first language: he has said that his first language was "a broken Xining language which was (a dialect of) the Chinese language", a form of Central Plains Mandarin, and his family speak neither Amdo Tibetan nor Lhasa Tibetan.

Major Subdialects


Xining dialect
Yinchuan dialect

References

Mandarin Chinese